Yuri Jew, better known as Keith, is an American professional League of Legends player who is the support for the Golden Guardians. He previously played for Echo Fox, Team Liquid and Team SoloMid of the League of Legends Championship Series (LCS). Keith was instrumental in one of the biggest comebacks in LCS history during a game against Team Dignitas in the 2016 Spring NA LCS.

Career 
Keith began competing in League of Legends in 2014 with Team Gyrations, until its disbandment in July 2014. He joined Team LoLPro in November 2014 to play in the LoL Expansion Tournament. LoLPro qualified for the tournament via the Challenger ladder under the name Thomas and the Slotkins. They defeated Fission in the first round but then lost to Team Coast in the second round and were eliminated from the tournament. Although his primary role is AD carry, Keith played support while with LoLPro.

Keith played his first LCS match on January 24, 2015, for Team Liquid. His LCS debut was due to teammate Chae "Piglet" Gwang-jin's inability to play due to visa problems. Keith was originally a member of Curse Academy but stayed with the Team Liquid organization after Curse Academy rebranded to Gravity. After Week 1 of the 2015 NA LCS Spring regular season, Team Liquid was the only team with a 2–0 record, with Keith contributing 15 kills, 23 assists, and only 2 deaths amounting to a KDA of 19.

For Week 5 of the 2015, NA LCS Spring Split Keith replaced Piglet as Team Liquid's bot laner. Soon after, he was sought out by Team SoloMid, which wanted him to play alongside Wildturtle. He played briefly for the team, but the coaching staff of Team SoloMid decided that Wildturtle's performance and skill was satisfactory enough on his own. He continued to stay on the bench, and after the season, joined Cloud9 Tempest.

Keith was announced as a starter for the Echo Fox roster upon the team's entry into the LCS in January 2016.

Echo Fox finished last in the 2016 Summer NA LCS, forcing them to play in the relegation tournament. They defeated NRG Esports 3–0 in their last relegation match and qualified for the 2017 NA LCS Spring Split.

Tournament results

Echo Fox 
 7th — 2016 Spring NA LCS regular season
 10th — 2016 Summer NA LCS regular season

References 

League of Legends AD Carry players
Cloud9 (esports) players
Curse Academy players
Echo Fox players
Golden Guardians players
Team Curse players
Team Liquid players
Team Liquid Academy players
Team SoloMid players
American esports players
People from San Leandro, California
Living people
1997 births